Mark Fountain (born 10 March 1982) is an Australian middle distance runner.

Fountain currently lives and trains in Geelong, Victoria and is married to former University of Arkansas All-America runner Erica Sigmont.

Fountain lived in Arkansas for six years whilst being coached by the University of Arkansas coach John McDonnell.

In 2009, Fountain moved back to Australia to be coached by Bruce Scriven and former Olympic Champion Steve Ovett.

After a troublesome two years battling Achilles injuries, Fountain underwent an operation to alleviate his problems and get him on track once again.

Fountain is the General Manager of Supaworld, an indoor family entertainment centre which has four locations Australia wide. He has worked there since 2014.

Achievements

 8th world Youth Championships Bydgoszcz, Poland(1999)
 5th World University Championships Daegue, Korea(2003)
 3rd Commonwealth Games Melbourne, Australia(2006)
 9th(h) World Championships Osaka, Japan (2007)
 Australian indoor record 1000m: 2.20.3 (2005)
 Australian indoor record mile:  3.54.7 (2005)
 Bronze medalist at 1500 m 2006 Melbourne Commonwealth Games
 Australian Under 18 Champion 1500 m 1999
 Australian Under 20 Champion 1500 m 2001
 Australian Under 20 Champion 3000 m 2001
 Australian Under 20 Champion X-Country 2001
 Australian National Champion 1500 m 2007
 Personal record: 1500 m 3.33.68

References

External links
 Athletics Australia profile
 Interview with Mark Fountain on Runnerstribe.com
 
 

1982 births
Living people
Australian male middle-distance runners
Athletes (track and field) at the 2006 Commonwealth Games
Commonwealth Games medallists in athletics
Commonwealth Games bronze medallists for Australia
Medallists at the 2006 Commonwealth Games